Stefano Braschi (born 6 June 1957 in Barberino di Mugello, Florence) is a retired Italian football referee. He is fluent in Italian, English and French.

Braschi officiated in qualifying matches for the 1998 and 2002 World Cups, as well as a Euro 2000 preliminary match between Poland and Bulgaria. He also served as a referee for major international club contests, taking charge of the 2000 UEFA Champions League Final, the 1998 UEFA Cup Winners' Cup Final, and two matches at the 2000 FIFA Club World Championship.

He is married to his wife, Paola. The pair have three adopted children.

Honours
Serie A Referee of the Year (2): 1999, 2001
Italian Football Hall of Fame: 2014

References 

1957 births
Living people
People from Barberino di Mugello
Italian football referees
UEFA Champions League referees
Sportspeople from the Metropolitan City of Florence